Emancipation Park may refer to:

Emancipation Park (Houston), a park in Houston, Texas, United States
Emancipation Park (Kingston, Jamaica), a park in Kingston, Jamaica
Market Street Park, a park in Charlottesville, Virginia, United States formerly known as Emancipation Park
 Emancipation Park, part of the Charlotte Amalie Historic District, in Saint Thomas, U.S. Virgin Islands

See also
Emancipation Garden